Ransom is a male given name which may refer to:
 Ransom Cook (1794–1881), American inventor
 Ransom W. Dunham (1838–1896), U.S. Representative from Illinois
 Ransom Dunn (1818–1900), American minister and theologian
 Ransom L. Ford (1878–1973), American politician from Michigan
 Ransom H. Gillet (1800–1876), U.S. Representative from New York
 Ransom Halloway (1793–1851), U.S. Representative from New York
 Ransom C. Johnson (1849–1904), American politician from Michigan
 Ransom Asa Moore, an agronomist and professor at the University of Wisconsin-Madison
 Ransom B. Moore (1827–1904), California pioneer and Arizona Territory Legislator
 Ransom A. Myers (1952–2007), marine biologist and conservationist
 Ransom E. Olds (1864–1950), American automotive industry pioneer, for whom both the Oldsmobile and REO brands were named
 Ransom Riggs, American writer and filmmaker
 Ransom B. Shelden, Sr. (1814–1878), founder of Houghton, Michigan
 Ransom Stephens, American physicist and writer

See also
 Ransome Gillett Holdridge (1836–1899), an early San Francisco school painter
 Ransome Judson Williams (1872–1970), American politician and 102nd Governor of South Carolina